This is a list of four-dimensional games—specifically, a list of video games that attempt to represent four-dimensional space.

Games

See also

Fourth dimension (disambiguation)
N-dimensional sequential move puzzle
Stereoscopy
List of stereoscopic video games

References

F
Four-dimensional geometry